Bicci di Lorenzo (1373–1452) was an Italian painter and sculptor, active in Florence.

He was born in Florence in 1373, the son of the painter, Lorenzo di Bicci, whose workshop he joined. He married in 1418, and in 1424 was registered in the Guild of Painters at Florence. His son, Neri di Bicci was also a painter and took over the family workshop. Bicci di Lorenzo died in Florence in 1452 and was buried in Santa Maria del Carmine.

Following early work – largely frescoes – in collaboration with his father, he received a number of important commissions, including, according to Vasari, from the Medici for a cycle of frescoes of Illustrious Men for the Palazzo Medici. For the Opera del Duomo, he painted frescoes of the apostles.  And he painted a Saints Cosmas and Damian and frescoes representing the dedication of the church itself for Sant'Egidio in the hospital of Santa Maria Nuova.

Among his major works are an Enthroned Madonna now in the National Gallery at Parma; the Three Scenes from the Life of St Nicholas, a triptych in the cathedral of Fiesole; and a Nativity in the church of San Giovannino dei Cavalieri in Florence. He frescoed the entrance to the Compagni chapel in the church of Santa Trinita, and in the area around Florence, there are frescoes at the Oratory of Sant'Antonio Abate, Pescia; Empoli; and at Lastra a Signa. Tempera panels depicting Saints John the Baptist and Miniato and Saint Anthony and Saint Stephen are found in the Legion of Honor Museum in San Francisco.

References

External links
 Bicci di Lorenzo at the National Gallery of Art, Washington DC

Further reading
 (see index; plate 73)

1373 births
1452 deaths
Italian sculptors
Italian male sculptors
14th-century Italian painters
Italian male painters
15th-century Italian painters
Painters from Florence
Fresco painters